The Inverell Times is an English language newspaper published in Inverell, New South Wales, Australia. It absorbed the Inverell Argus in 1925. It is published bi-weekly on Tuesday and Friday, and as an online publication.

History 
The Inverell Times was established on 12 June 1875 by Thomas Harland, a former school teacher, and Colin Ross. Kate Bond was proprietor of the paper for eight years after the death of her husband, William Henry Bond, in 1895.

See also   
 List of newspapers in Australia
 List of newspapers in New South Wales

References

External links 
 

Newspapers published in New South Wales